Bless This House is a British sitcom that aired on ITV from 2 February 1971 to 22 April 1976. Starring Sid James and Diana Coupland, it was created by Vince Powell and Harry Driver, but mainly written by other hands including Dave Freeman and Carla Lane. It was made for the ITV network by Thames Television. In 2004, Bless This House was ranked by a BBC poll as the 67th Best British Sitcom.

Synopsis 
Bless This House centres on life in Howard Road, New Malden, where travelling stationery salesman Sid Abbott and his wife Jean live with their teenagers: Mike is fresh from art college and more pre-occupied with protests than finding a job; and trendy schoolgirl Sally. Mike is 18 and Sally is 16, at the series' start. Sid and Jean constantly battle to comprehend the new generation's permissive ways and are usually out-of-touch. Their neighbours and best friends are Trevor Lewis and his wife Betty.

A total of 65 episodes of Bless This House were produced between 1971 and 1976.

Cast
Sidney James as Sid Abbott. Jean Abbott's husband and an Arsenal F.C. fan. He likes to believe he is in control of his household, but finds he has to sneak out to go to the football or the public house. He often tries to avoid occasions he doesn't want to attend, but this often backfires on him.
Diana Coupland as Jean Abbott. Sid's wife, who believes she can talk him into or out of anything. She always knows what he's up to and sees through his schemes.
Robin Stewart as Mike Abbott. Jean and Sid's son, their firstborn. He is an artist but he always avoids employment because "it's a drag."  
Sally Geeson as Sally Abbott. Jean and Sid's daughter, Mike's little sister. Sid and Jean constantly worry about her relationships with "boys." She calls Sid "Daddy" and Jean "Mummy."   Sally married Bless This House producer William G. Stewart in 1976 and had two children during their 10 years of marriage. 
Anthony Jackson as Trevor Lewis. The Abbotts' next-door neighbour and Sid's best friend.
Patsy Rowlands as Betty Lewis. Trevor's wife and Jean's best friend. Jean and Betty usually gang up on their husbands if they don't do the right things.

Production
The show was produced and directed by William G. Stewart, later the host of Channel 4’s 15 to 1 gameshow, and had theme music written by Geoff Love. A comic strip version was also produced, written by Angus Allan and printed in TV comic Look-in. The first seven episodes were made in black-and-white due to the ITV colour strike. Every episode was recorded in Studio 1 at the Thames Television studios based in Teddington.

The series ended abruptly on 22 April 1976, when just four days after broadcast of the 13th and final episode of the sixth series, Sid James collapsed on stage at the Sunderland Empire Theatre during a performance of The Mating Season after failing to respond to a cue. James had suffered a heart attack and later died on the way to the hospital.

At the time of James's death, plans were in place for a seventh and eighth series of the show and a second feature film. Ironically, James had told his co-star Diana Coupland, "it's such fun and so successful, we'll still be working on Bless This House till one of us kicks the bucket."

Film

A film version of the TV series was made in 1972. While it still starred Diana Coupland and Sid James as the Abbotts, Robin Askwith, who had previously appeared in the TV series, played Mike instead of TV series regular Robin Stewart due to the latter being unable to find time to appear in the film, having already been booked for the summer season on Bournemouth Pier. In addition, it featured "new" neighbours played by Terry Scott and June Whitfield. June later guest starred in an episode of the regular series, although as a different character. The part of Trevor was also recast with Peter Butterworth replacing Jackson. All the original actors returned for series three. Additionally, Mike gets married at the end of the film; this had no effect on the storylines in the television series.

Home media
All six series of Bless This House have been released on DVD in the UK including a Box Set containing all six series plus the feature film through Network DVD.

In Australia, Series 1  was released on 2 April 2009, Series 2 on 3 October 2012 and Series 3 on 6 March 2013, no further individual seasons have been released. A Complete Series 1-6 Box Set was released on 6 November 2013. Via Vision Entertainment obtained the rights to the series and will release 'The Complete Series' on 9 December 2020.

ITV3 started repeating the series on 17 June 2020, with minor edits.

Series overview

Series 1: 2 February 1971 to 20 April 1971 (12 episodes)
Series 2: 21 February 1972 to 15 May 1972 (12 episodes)
Series 3: 22 January 1973 to 28 May 1973 (12 episodes)
Series 4: 20 February 1974 to 10 April 1974 (6 episodes)
Series 5: 14 October 1974 to 16 December 1974 (10 episodes)
Series 6: 29 January 1976 to 22 April 1976 (13 episodes)

Episodes

Series 1 (1971)

 "The Generation Gap" – 2 February 1971
 "Mum’s The Word" – 9 February 1971
 "Father’s Day" – 16 February 1971
 "Be It Ever So Humble" – 23 February 1971 
 "Another Fine Mess" – 2 March 1971
 "For Whom The Bells Toll" – 9 March 1971
 "A Woman’s Place" – 16 March 1971
 "The Day of Rest" – 23 March 1971
 "Make Love…Not War!" – 30 March 1971
 "Charity Begins at Home" – 6 April 1971
 "If The Dog Collar Fits…Wear It!" – 13 April 1971
 "The Morning After The Night Before" – 20 April 1971

Series 2 (1972)

 "Two Heads Are Better Than One" – 21 February 1972
 "Love Me, Love My Tree" – 28 February 1972
 "It’s All In The Mind" – 6 March 1972
 "Another Lost Weekend" – 13 March 1972
 "Parents Should Be Seen And Not Heard" – 20 March 1972
 "Strangers In The Night" – 27 March 1972
 "Get Me To The Match On Time" – 10 April 1972
 "Wives and Lovers" – 17 April 1972
 "Never Again on Sunday" – 24 April 1972
 "People In Glass Houses" – 1 May 1972
 "A Rolls By Another Name" – 8 May 1972
 "A Touch Of The Unknown" – 15 May 1972

Series 3 (1973)

 "It Comes To Us All In The End" – 22 January 1973
 "Tea For Two And Four For Tea" – 5 February 1973
 "To Tell Or Not To Tell" – 12 February 1973
 "Blood Is Thicker Than Water" – 19 February 1973
 "One Good Turn Deserves A Bother" – 26 February 1973
 "The Loneliness Of The Short Distance Walker" – 5 March 1973
 "Watch The Birdie" – 12 March 1973
 "Aitishoo! Aitishoo! We All Fall Down" – 30 April 1973
 "Entente Not So Cordiale" – 7 May 1973
 "Will The Real Sid Abbott Stand Up Please" – 14 May 1973
 "I’m Not Jealous, I’ll Kill Him" – 21 May 1973
 "A Girl’s Worst Friend Is Her Father" – 28 May 1973

Series 4 (1974)

 "Money Is The Root Of..." – 20 February 1974
 "And They Will Come Home…" – 27 February 1974
 "Who’s Minding The Baby?" – 20 March 1974
 "A Beef In His Bonnet" – 27 March 1974
 "The Bells Are Ringing" – 3 April 1974
 "The First 25 Years Are The Worst" – 10 April 1974

Series 5 (1974)

 "They Don’t Write Songs Like That Anymore" – 14 October 1974
 "The Gypsy’s Warning" – 21 October 1974
 "The Biggest Woodworm In The World" – 28 October 1974
 "Home Tweet Home" – 4 November 1974
 "You’re Never Too Old To Be Young" – 11 November 1974
 "The Policeman, The Paint and The Pirates" – 18 November 1974
 "Happy Birthday Sid" – 25 November 1974
 "Freedom Is" – 2 December 1974
 "'Mr. Chairman......" – 9 December 1974
 "....And Afterwards At...." – 16 December 1974

Series 6 (1976)

 "The Frozen Limit" – 29 January 1976
 "Beautiful Dreamer" – 5 February 1976
 "Fish With Everything" – 12 February 1976
 "The Naked Paperhanger" – 19 February 1976
 "Remember Me?" – 26 February 1976
 "Something Of Value" – 4 March 1976
 "Men Of Consequence" – 11 March 1976
 "Skin Deep" – 18 March 1976
 "Friends And Neighbours" – 25 March 1976
 "Well, Well, Well…" – 1 April 1976
 "The Phantom Pools Winner" – 8 April 1976
 "A Matter Of Principle" – 15 April 1976
 "Some Enchanted Evening" – 22 April 1976

See also
List of films based on British television series

References

External links
blessthishouse.net - Unofficial fan site.
.
.
Bless this house at British TV comedy.
Bless this house at British classic comedy.

1971 British television series debuts
1976 British television series endings
1970s British sitcoms
English-language television shows
ITV sitcoms
Television series by Fremantle (company)
Television shows produced by Thames Television
Television shows set in London
Television shows adapted into films
Television shows shot at Teddington Studios